Hamme is a municipality located in the Belgian province of East Flanders. In 2018, Hamme had a total population of 24,827. The total area is 40.21 km². The current mayor of Hamme is Herman Vijt, from the CD&V (Christian Democratic) party.

Hamme also has its own legends. The most famous one is the legend of the "Hamse Wuiten". The people of Hamme are also called Hamse Wuitens. The "Hamse wuiten" is also the main mascot in a streetparade at the end of March every year. The inhabitants dress up and build big trucks with funny giant puppets, making fun of local and national politicians and scandals.

Famous inhabitants
Ferdinand Bracke, cyclist
Herman Brusselmans, writer
Amaat Joos, Canon and antropologue
Linde Merckpoel, radio presenter
Frans Van Damme, painter
Benoît Van Uytvanck, sculptor
Kristel Verbeke, singer
Hanne Verbruggen, singer
Petrus Vertenten, missionary and portraitist

See also
Lippenbroek

References

External links 

Municipalities of East Flanders
Populated places in East Flanders
 

sq:Ama